Sir George Probert DL (c. 1617 – 6 January 1677), of Pant glas, Raglan, Monmouthshire, was a Welsh politician.

He was the only son of Henry Probert of Pant Glas. He was knighted in 1643.

He was appointed a Deputy Lieutenant of Monmouthshire and served as such from 1660 to his death.

He was a Member (MP) of the Parliament of England for Monmouth Boroughs from 1661 to 1677.

He married Magdalen, the daughter of Sir Charles Williams of Llangibby. They had 2 sons and 3 daughters.

References

1617 births
1677 deaths
17th-century Welsh politicians
People from Raglan, Monmouthshire
Knights Bachelor
Deputy Lieutenants of Monmouthshire
English MPs 1661–1679